The Mohammad Shtayyeh Government or State of Palestine Government of April 2019 is the eighteenth Palestinian government. Mohammad Shtayyeh was assigned to formally form it on 10 March 2019, after the resignation of Palestinian Unity Government of June 2014. The government was sworn in on 13 April  2019 in front of the President of the State of Palestine Mahmoud Abbas.

Members of the Government

References

Cabinets established in 2019
2019 establishments in the State of Palestine
State of Palestine governments
Current governments